Comp, COMP or Comps may refer to:

Places
In England:
 Comp, Kent
In France:
 Comps, Drôme
 Comps, Gard
 Comps, Gironde
 Comps-la-Grand-Ville
 Comps-sur-Artuby

Arts, entertainment, and media
Music
Accompaniment, especially in jazz 
Comping (jazz)
Compilation album
Comping (post-production), an edited recording from the best parts of multiple takes

Business and finance
 Comps (casino), complimentary items or services given by casinos to patrons to encourage gambling
Comparable company analysis
Comparables, in real estate
Comprehensive layout, in advertising and marketing, a proposed design presented to a client
Same-store sales
 Workers' compensation, compensation for work-related injuries and diseases

Computing and technology
 Comp (command), a command in some computer operating systems which compares two or more files
 Comp.*, a class of Usenet groups devoted to computers and related technology
 Coordinated Multipoint (CoMP), a wireless communication technology

Education
 College of Osteopathic Medicine of the Pacific, an osteopathic medical school in Pomona, California
 Composition studies, writing instruction emphasizing content and structure, as opposed to handwriting
 Comprehensive examination, in higher education 
 Comprehensive school, a type of school in the United Kingdom

Science
 Cartilage oligomeric matrix protein, or COMP
 Comparettia, an orchid genus

Other uses
 Comp cards, used by modeling agencies in promoting models
 Competition Eliminator, a drag racing class commonly called Comp or Comp Eliminator
 Recoil compensator, a mechanism on a firearm
 Sweepstakes, called competitions or comps in Australia